Kilmeny is a surviving 1915 American comedy silent film directed by Oscar Apfel and written by Louise B. Stanwood. The film stars Lenore Ulric, William Desmond, Doris Baker, Herbert Standing, Howard Davies and Gordon Griffith. The film was released July 22, 1915, by Paramount Pictures.

Plot

Cast 
Lenore Ulric as Doris Calhoun
William Desmond as Bob Meredith
Doris Baker as Doris Calhoun, as a child 
Herbert Standing as Gypsy Chief
Howard Davies as Barouche
Gordon Griffith as Pierre, the boy
Marshall Mackaye as Pierre, the Man
Frederick Wilson as Lord Leigh
Myrtle Stedman as Lady Leigh

Preservation status
A print is preserved in the Library of Congress collection Packard Campus for Audio-Visual Conservation.

References

External links 
 
 

1915 films
1910s English-language films
Silent American comedy films
1915 comedy films
Paramount Pictures films
Films directed by Oscar Apfel
American black-and-white films
American silent feature films
1910s American films